Citi Private Bank, a subsidiary of multinational banking conglomerate Citigroup, markets Private banking services for ultra high-net-worth individual clients, including entrepreneurs and senior corporate executives. It has 60 offices in 23 countries. Citi Private Bank's major competitors are JP Morgan Chase, Goldman Sachs, Bank of America Private Bank, UBS, and HSBC Private Bank.

Products and services

Its Private banking services are divided between ultra-high net-worth clients, Family Offices and Law Firm groups, which focus on servicing the needs of ultra-high net-worth individuals, family offices and law firms and their lawyers. Formerly part of Global Wealth Management, Citi Private Bank is now part of Citi's Institutional Clients Group. Therefore, Citi Private Bank clients are treated as institutional investors rather than consumer banking clients. The Citi Private Bank's Investment solutions group provides wealth advisory services to the bank's clients.

Account Requirements
To qualify for a Citi Private Bank account, one must have a net worth of at least US$25 million. This requirement is waived for law firm clients and qualified high net worth individual clients.

References

External links

Citi Private Bank Website

Citigroup